One Dozen Candles was a series of history and opinion books criticizing communism, labor unions, and welfare policies that was assembled by Robert W. Welch, Jr. and published during the 1960s by Western Islands, the publishing arm of American right-wing advocacy group the John Birch Society. On the series packaging, the name One Dozen Candles was accompanied by the proverb, "It is better to light one candle than to curse the darkness." Earlier editions also carried the branding for the "American Opinion Reprint Series" while later editions were part of "The Americanist Library."

The books included in the One Dozen Candles were paperback reprints of books written between 1938 and 1965 by a variety of authors, some of whom were never members of nor ideologically aligned with the John Birch Society. The twelve selections changed slightly over the course of the years and a thirteenth volume was added in later collections.

Series entries
Earlier collections 

Later collections 

13th title included in boxed sets was not included in printed listing on package

See also
 John Birch Society
 Robert W. Welch Jr.
 Western Islands (publisher)

References

Books about conservatism
Conservative media in the United States
Criticism of trade unions
John Birch Society
Series of non-fiction books
Works about American history